Kolar Darreh (also Romanized as Kolār Darreh) is a village in Balatajan Rural District, in the Central District of Qaem Shahr County, Mazandaran Province, Iran. At the 2006 census, its population was 130, in 32 families.

References 

Populated places in Qaem Shahr County